Sarah Lewis may refer to:

 Sarah Charles Lewis (born 2004), American actress
 Sarah-Jane Lewis (born 1987), British soprano
 Sarah Lewis (professor), author, curator and historian
 Sarah Lewis (alpine skier) (born 1964), British former alpine skier
 Sarah Jamie Lewis, anonymity and privacy researcher
 Sarah Lianne Lewis (born 1988), Welsh composer